Adam Pierończyk (born 24 January 1970) is a Polish jazz saxophonist and composer. He plays tenor and soprano saxophones, as well as the zoucra.

Early life
Pierończyk was born in Elblag, Poland, on 24 January 1970. He learned the piano for three years from the age of eight, and later switched to saxophone. After moving with his parents to Germany, he "enrolled in the jazz department at the Higher Music School".

Later life and career
Pierończyk has won awards from the Polish magazine Jazz Forum: New Hope of Polish Jazz in 1997, and the readers' choice as Best Soprano Saxophonist in 2003 and 2004. His tribute to pianist/composer Krzysztof Komeda, Komeda: The Innocent Sorcerer, was released in 2010. His Adam Pierończyk Quartet, from around the same time, was based on saxophone and trombone, without chordal instruments.

Playing style
The Jazz Book by Joachim-Ernst Berendt describes Pierończyk as an "emotionally enormously powerful stylist [...] whose playing is deeply founded in the great black tenor [saxophone] tradition". His playing on Adam Pierończyk Quartet was described by a New York City Jazz Record reviewer as: "folk-futurist along the lines of Ornette Coleman, [...with] nursery-rhyme melodies that seem to change key every few bars, stringing together fragmented phrases".

Discography

References

External links
Official website

Jazz saxophonists
Polish jazz musicians
Living people
Festival directors
1970 births
21st-century saxophonists